Wing Commander Shaliza Dhami is an officer in the Indian Air Force (IAF). She is the first woman officer in the IAF to receive a permanent commission and the first woman to become a Flight Commander. She became first woman IAF officer to get selected in front-line combat unit.

Career
Born in Ludhiana, Punjab. Dhami holds a Bachelor of Technology degree in Electronics and Communication.  Her first solo flight was in 2003 in a HAL HPT-32 Deepak. She was commissioned a flying officer in the Air Force on 20 December 2003 on a short-service commission, and was promoted to flight lieutenant on 20 December 2005 and to squadron leader on 20 December 2009.

Promoted wing commander on 20 December 2016, Dhami became a Flight Commander in August 2019, the first woman officer in India to do so. She is a flight commander of a Chetak helicopter unit at Hindan Air Force Station. She also became the first woman flying instructor of the IAF for Chetak and Cheetah helicopters; this makes her the first woman flying instructor in the IAF. On 18 December 2018, Dhami became the first woman officer in the Indian Air Force to be granted a permanent commission.

See also 

 Squadron Leader Minty Agarwal

References 

Indian Air Force officers
Year of birth missing (living people)
Living people
Indian women aviators
Indian women in war